The Tugaloo River (originally Tugalo River) is a  river that forms part of the border between the U.S. states of Georgia and South Carolina. It was named for the historic Cherokee town of Tugaloo at the mouth of Toccoa Creek, south of present-day Toccoa, Georgia and Travelers Rest State Historic Site in Stephens County, Georgia.

It is fed by the Tallulah River and the Chattooga River, which each form an arm of Lake Tugalo, on the edge of Georgia's Tallulah Gorge State Park. The Tugaloo flows out of the lake via Tugaloo Dam, passing into Lake Yonah and through Yonah Dam. The river ends as an arm of Lake Hartwell, as does South Carolina's Seneca River after its confluence with the Keowee River. Below Lake Hartwell, it is called the Savannah River.

History
Competing state territorial claims to the river and its islands were settled with the Treaty of Beaufort in 1787, as interpreted in the two Georgia v. South Carolina cases before the U.S. Supreme Court in 1922 and 1989. The river is one of the boundaries of the Treaty of Hopewell and the Treaty of New York (1790).

The river's watershed is home to some of the most challenging whitewater in the Southeast, luring sport kayakers and canoeists from all over the country.

Cherokee, pioneer and antebellum history are being highlighted by developments of the Stephens County Foundation along the river. South of Yonah Dam was the former site of Estatoe, an historic Cherokee town. Tugaloo Bend Heritage Park is an 87-acre park established here to interpret this history. It is part of the Tugaloo River Historic Corridor that includes sites from later periods of history, extending south along the river to the former area of the historic Tugaloo town of the Cherokee.

The name of the river comes from Tugaloo (ᏚᎩᎷᏱ), an historic Cherokee town that was located along the river near the mouth of Toccoa Creek.

References

External links

South Carolina DHEC

Rivers of Georgia (U.S. state)
Rivers of South Carolina
Borders of South Carolina
Borders of Georgia (U.S. state)
Rivers of Anderson County, South Carolina
Rivers of Oconee County, South Carolina
Rivers of Hart County, Georgia
Rivers of Franklin County, Georgia
Rivers of Stephens County, Georgia
Rivers of Habersham County, Georgia
Tributaries of the Savannah River